Sunadavinodini is a rāgam in Carnatic music (musical scale of South Indian classical music). It is an audava rāgam (or owdava rāgam, meaning pentatonic scale). It is a janya rāgam (derived scale), as it does not have all the seven swaras (musical notes). This raga was discovered by Mysore Vasudevachar.

Structure and Lakshana

Sunadavinodini is a symmetric rāgam that does not contain rishabham and panchamam. It is a pentatonic scale (audava-audava ragam in Carnatic music classification – audava meaning 'of 5'). Its  structure (ascending and descending scale) is as follows (see swaras in Carnatic music for details on below notation and terms):

 : 
 : 
(notes used in this scale are antara gandharam, prati madhyamam, chathusruthi dhaivatham, kakali nishadham)

Sunadavinodini is considered a janya rāgam of Gamanashrama, the 53rd Melakarta rāgam, though it can be derived from 2 other melakarta rāgams, Kalyani or Kosalam, by dropping both rishabham and panchamam.

Popular compositions
Sunadavinodini rāgam lends itself for elaboration and exploration and has many compositions. Here are some popular kritis composed in Sunadavinodini.

Devadhi deva sri vasudeva by Mysore Vasudevacharya
Samagana sunadavinodini by G Gururakacharya
Sanatani sri sunadavinodini by Mrs Kalyani Varadarajan
Sri Venugopala by Anonymous
vagadhishvari devi vara-muni-gana-vandite by Bharani

Film Songs

Language:Tamil

Related rāgams
This section covers the theoretical and scientific aspect of this rāgam.

Graha bhedam 
Sunadavinodini's notes when shifted using Graha bhedam, yields 2 other pentatonic rāgams, namely, Shivaranjani and Revati. See Graha bhedam on Shivaranjani for more details and an illustration.

Scale similarities
Hamsānandi is a popular rāgam which sounds similar to Sunadavinodini and has the shuddha rishabham extra when compared to it. Its  structure is : 
Amritavarshini is another popular rāgam which has the panchamam in place of the dhaivatam when compared to Sunadavinodini. Its  structure is :

Notes

References

Janya ragas